Vicenistatin is a macrolactam antibiotic synthesized by Streptomyces halstedii HC34. It was originally isolated from this bacterium in 1993.  It includes the unusual starter unit  methylaspartate.

References 

Macrolide antibiotics